Hipster Daddy-O and the Handgrenades (HDH) is a band that was formed in 1997 in Tucson, Arizona. Combining various influences from swing music, ska, rockabilly and rock, Hipster Daddy-O and the Handgrenades attracted a local following throughout the Southwest of the United States. They are most associated with the swing revival movement of the late 1990s. The band's musical style, however, transcends any single genre.

After earning critical praise and local awards from The Tucson Weekly (including "Best Swing Band 1998", "Best Dressed Band 1998" and Best Live Performance 1998")  Hipster Daddy-O embarked on several national tours throughout 1998, 1999, and 2000, touring and playing shows with the bands Real Big Fish, Big Bad Voodoo Daddy, and The Aquabats. Their debut album "Armed and Swingin'" was released in 1998 on Slimstyle Records and included the original song "The Perpetrator" which was later featured in the Farrelly Brothers  movie Me, Myself & Irene starring Jim Carrey in the year 2000. The CD "Armed and swingin'" also included the track "Daddy-O" that was later used at the 2000 Summer Olympics in Sydney Australia by Russian gymnast Elena Zamolodchikova in her gold medal winning floor routine. The band's second album "Diesel" was released in October 2000 on the Slimstyle and BMG Music labels. Hipster Daddy-O has also been featured in the October 1999 issue of Rolling Stone (Germany)  and has had songs featured on several compilation CD's.

Current band members 
Eric Allen - Vocals
Grant Lange - Trumpet
Andrew Sternberg - Alto/Tenor Sax
Kris Wiedeman - Trombone
Mike Edward - Guitar/Vocals
Ty Lebsack - Bass
Daryl Seymour - Drums

Former band members 

Andrew "Boozeman" Skaggs - Trombone
Jeff "Tidypaws" Grubic - Baritone/Alto sax

Discography

Studio albums

Compilations

Movie soundtrack appearances

Notes and references

External links 
 Official site

Rock music groups from Arizona
Musical groups established in 1997
Musical groups from Tucson, Arizona
Swing revival ensembles